Ruler 5 is the designated title for the fifth ruler of Copan after the reformation by K'inich Yax K'uk' Mo'.

Notes

References

5th-century monarchs in North America
Rulers of Copán
485 deaths
Year of birth missing
5th century in the Maya civilization
Unidentified people